The Gardens may refer to the following two places in New Zealand:
The Gardens, Auckland, a suburb of Manukau
The Gardens, Otago, a suburb of Dunedin